Elections in Saudi Arabia are rare. Municipal elections were last held in 2015, the first time women had the right to vote and stand as candidates.

History
The first municipal elections in Saudi Arabia took place in the mid-1920s in the Hijaz cities of Mecca, Medina, Jeddah, Yanbu and Taif, as King Abdulaziz ibn Saud established local governments to replace Ottoman and Hashemite rule. Elections for other municipalities were held between 1954 and 1962 during the reign of King Saud, an experiment that ended under the centralization of King Faisal.

In 2005, elections for half of the municipal councilors were held, with men aged over 21 voting for male candidates. In May 2009, elections scheduled for October were postponed so authorities could consider expanding those eligible to vote, including women. Women were not granted franchise until after the 2011 elections, which drew condemnation from Human Rights Watch; some female activists planned 'parallel' municipal councils following the vote.

Saudi Arabia's Consultative Assembly (Majlis ash-Shura) is wholly advisory in function, with 150 appointed members and the Speaker, currently Abdullah ibn Muhammad Al ash-Sheikh, appointed by the King. Political parties are outlawed.

Women's participation
Arguments against female suffrage were that not enough women would be available to staff female polling stations (gender segregation is normal in the country) and that only a small number of women held ID cards, which would be required in order for them to vote. Amnesty International called King Abdullah's 2011 announcement women could stand for election and vote from 2012 "a welcome, albeit limited, step along the long road towards gender equality in Saudi Arabia, and a testament to the long struggle of women's rights activists there".

Women's rights remains a controversial subject in Saudi Arabia.

See also
Women's rights in Saudi Arabia
Women's suffrage

References